The following is a list of the Billboard magazine R&B albums that reached number one in 1994:

Chart history

See also
1994 in music
R&B number-one hits of 1994 (USA)

1994